Washington County Courthouse is a historic county courthouse in Sandersville, Georgia, county seat of Washington County, Georgia. It was built in 1869 and renovated in 1899 under the supervision of L.F. Goodrich. It was added to the National Register of Historic Places on September 18, 1980 and is located on Courthouse Square.

See also
National Register of Historic Places listings in Washington County, Georgia

References

Courthouses on the National Register of Historic Places in Georgia (U.S. state)
County courthouses in Georgia (U.S. state)
Government buildings completed in 1869
Buildings and structures in Washington County, Georgia
1869 establishments in Georgia (U.S. state)
National Register of Historic Places in Washington County, Georgia